The mouse-eared bats or myotises are a diverse and widespread genus (Myotis) of bats within the family Vespertilionidae. The noun "myotis" itself is a New Latin construction, from the Greek "muós (meaning "mouse") and "oûs" (meaning ear), literally translating to "mouse-eared".

Relationships
Myotis has historically been included in the subfamily Vespertilioninae, but was classified in its own subfamily, Myotinae, by Nancy Simmons in 1998. In her 2005 classification in Mammal Species of the World, Simmons listed the genera Cistugo and Lasionycteris in the Myotinae in addition to Myotis itself. However, molecular data indicate that Cistugo is distantly related to all other Vespertilionidae, so  it was reclassified into its own family, the Cistugidae, and that Lasionycteris belongs in the Vespertilioninae. The genus Submyotodon has since been added to the subfamily, making it and Myotis its only members.

Appearance and behavior
Their ears are normally longer than they are wide, with a long and lance-shaped tragus, hence their English and zoological names. The species within this genus vary in size from very large to very small for vesper bats, with a single pair of mammary glands.

Mouse-eared bats are generally insectivores. M. vivesi, and several members of the trawling bat ecomorph Leuconoe, have relatively large feet with long toes, and take small fish from the water surface (they also take insects).

Longevity
Myotis species are remarkably long-lived for their size; in 2018, researchers  revealed that a longitudinal study appears to indicate that Myotis telomeres do not shrink with age, and that telomerase does not appear to be present in the Myotis metabolism. 13 species of Myotis bats live longer than 20 years and 4 species live longer than 30 years. The longest-living species of Myotis, and longest-living bat in general, is thought to be the Siberian bat (M. sibiricus); one individual discovered in 2005 was found to be over 41 years old at the time.

Species

Traditionally, Myotis was divided into three large subgenera—Leuconoe, Myotis, and Selysius. However, molecular data indicate that these subgenera are not natural groups, but instead unnatural assemblages of convergently similar species. Instead, Myotis species largely fall in two main clades, one containing Old World and the other New World species. The ITIS presently divides it into three subgenera: Chrysopteron (containing most reddish-colored Old World species), Myotis (containing almost all other Old World species), and Pizonyx (containing all New World species and the Eurasian Myotis brandtii and Myotis sibiricus, which are more closely related to New World species than to other Old World species). The Asian species Myotis latirostris falls outside the clade formed by these main groups, and has since been reclassified into a separate genus, Submyotodon, alongside several others.

Myotis is a highly species-rich genus, and the classification of many species remains unsettled. The taxonomy below is based on that of the ITIS in 2021. Some differences in taxonomy from the 2005 third edition of Mammal Species of the World are indicated in footnotes.

Subgenus Chrysopteron:
 Myotis anjouanensis (Dorst, 1960) - Anjouan myotis 
 Myotis bartelsii (Jentink, 1910) - Bartels's myotis
 Myotis bocagii (Peters, 1870) - rufous mouse-eared bat
 Myotis dieteri (Happold, 2005) - Kock's mouse-eared bat
 Myotis emarginatus (E. Geoffroy, 1806) - Geoffroy's bat
 Myotis formosus (Hodgson, 1835) - Hodgson's bat, copper-winged bat
 Myotis goudotii (A. Smith, 1834) - Malagasy mouse-eared bat
 Myotis hermani Thomas, 1923 - Herman's myotis
 Myotis morrisi Hill, 1971 - Morris's bat
 Myotis nimbaensis (Simmons et al., 2021) - Nimba mountain bat
 Myotis rufoniger (Tomes, 1858) - reddish-black myotis
 Myotis rufopictus (Waterhouse, 1845) - orange-fingered myotis
 Myotis scotti Thomas, 1927 - Scott's mouse-eared bat
 Myotis tricolor (Temminck, 1832) - Cape hairy bat, little brown bat, Temminck's mouse-eared bat, Cape myotis, tricoloured mouse-eared bat, Cape hairy myotis, Temminck's hairy bat, three-coloured bat
 Myotis weberi (Jentink, 1890) - Weber's myotis
 Myotis welwitschii (Gray, 1866) - Welwitsch's bat, Welwitsch's mouse-eared bat, Welwitsch's myotis
Subgenus Myotis:
 Myotis adversus (Horsfield, 1824) - large-footed bat, large-footed mouse-eared bat, large-footed myotis
 Myotis aelleni (Baud, 1979) - southern myotis (disputed species) 
 Myotis alcathoe (von Helversen and  Heller, 2001) - Alcathoe bat
 Myotis altarium (Thomas, 1911) - Szechwan myotis
 Myotis alticraniatus Osgood, 1932 - Indochinese whiskered myotis
 Myotis ancricola Kruskop, Borisenko, Dudorova, & Artyushin, 2018 - valley myotis
 Myotis annamiticus (Kruskop and Tsytsulina, 2001) - Annamit myotis
 Myotis annatessae Kruskop & Borisenko, 2013 - Anna Tess's myotis
 Myotis annectans (Dobson, 1871) - hairy-faced bat 
 Myotis ater (Peters, 1866) - Peters's myotis, small black myotis
 Myotis badius Tiunov, Kruskop, & Feng Jiang, 2011 - chestnut myotis
 Myotis bechsteinii (Kuhl, 1817) - Bechstein's bat
 Myotis blythii (Tomes, 1857) - lesser mouse-eared bat
 Myotis bombinus (Thomas, 1906) - Far Eastern myotis, bombinus bat 
 Myotis borneoensis Hill & Francis, 1984 - Bornean whiskered myotis 
 Myotis browni E. H. Taylor, 1934 - Brown's whiskered myotis
 Myotis bucharensis (Kuzyakin, 1950) - Bocharic myotis, Bokhara whiskered bat
 Myotis capaccinii (Bonaparte, 1837) - long-fingered bat
 Myotis chinensis (Tomes, 1857) - large myotis
 Myotis crypticus Ruedi, Ibáñez, Salicini, Juste & Puechmaille, 2019 - cryptic myotis
 Myotis csorbai (Topál, 1997) - Csorba's mouse-eared bat
 Myotis dasycneme (Boie, 1825) - pond bat
 Myotis daubentonii (Kuhl, 1817) - Daubenton's bat
 Myotis davidii (Peters, 1869) - David's myotis
 Myotis escalerai Cabrera, 1904 - Escalera's bat
 Myotis federatus Thomas, 1916 - Malaysian whiskered myotis
 Myotis fimbriatus (Peters, 1871) - fringed long-footed myotis
 Myotis frater G.M. Allen, 1923 - fraternal myotis
 Myotis gomantongensis Francis and  Hill, 1998 - Gomantong myotis
 Myotis hajastanicus Argyropulo, 1939 - Armenian whiskered bat, Hajastan myotis, Armenian myotis (disputed species)
 Myotis hasseltii (Temminck, 1840) - lesser large-footed bat
 Myotis horsfieldii (Temminck, 1840) - Horsfield's bat
 Myotis hoveli Harrison, 1964 - Hovel's myotis
 Myotis hyrcanicus Benda et al., 2012 - Hyrcanian myotis
 Myotis ikonnikovi Ognev, 1912 - Ikonnikov's bat
 Myotis indochinensis Son et al., 2013 - Indochinese myotis 
 Myotis insularum (Dobson, 1878) - insular myotis
 Myotis laniger Peters, 1871 - Chinese water myotis
 Myotis longicaudatus Ognev, 1927 - long-tailed myotis
 Myotis longipes (Dobson, 1873) - Kashmir cave bat
 Myotis macrodactylus (Temminck, 1840) - eastern long-fingered bat, big-footed myotis
 Myotis macropus (Gould, 1854) - southern myotis, large-footed myotis
 Myotis macrotarsus (Waterhouse, 1845) - pallid large-footed myotis, Philippine large-footed myotis
 Myotis melanorhinus Merriam, 1890 - dark-nosed small-footed myotis (disputed species)
 Myotis moluccarum (Thomas, 1915) - Maluku myotis, Arafura large-footed bat
 Myotis montivagus (Dobson, 1874) - Burmese whiskered bat
 Myotis muricola (Gray, 1846) - wall-roosting mouse-eared bat, Nepalese whiskered myotis
 Myotis myotis (Borkhausen, 1797) - greater mouse-eared bat 
 Myotis mystacinus (Kuhl, 1817) - whiskered bat
 Myotis nattereri (Kuhl, 1817) - Natterer's bat
 Myotis nipalensis Dobson, 1871 - Nepal myotis
 Myotis pequinius Thomas, 1908 - Beijing mouse-eared bat, Peking myotis
 Myotis petax Hollister, 1912 - eastern water bat, Sakhalin bat
 Myotis peytoni Wroughton & Ryley, 1913 - Peyton's myotis
 Myotis phanluongi Borisenko, Kruskop and  Ivanova, 2008 - Phan Luong's myotis
 Myotis pilosus Peters, 1869 - Rickett's big-footed bat 
 Myotis pruinosus Yoshiyuki, 1971 - frosted myotis
 Myotis punicus Felten, Spitzenberger and Storch, 1977 - Felten's myotis 
 Myotis ridleyi Thomas, 1898 - Ridley's bat
 Myotis rosseti (Oey, 1951) - thick-thumbed myotis
 Myotis schaubi Kormos, 1934 - Schaub's myotis
 Myotis secundus Ruedi, Csorba, Lin, & Chou , 2015 - long-toed myotis
 Myotis sicarius Thomas, 1915 - Mandelli's mouse-eared bat
 Myotis siligorensis (Horsfield, 1855) - Himalayan whiskered bat
 Myotis soror Ruedi, Csorba, Lin, & Chou, 2015 - reddish myotis
 Myotis sowerbyi Howell, 1926 - Sowerby's whiskered myotis
 Myotis stalkeri Thomas, 1910 - Kei myotis
 Myotis tschuliensis Kuzyakin, 1935 - Tschuli myotis
 Myotis yanbarensis Maeda and  Matsumara, 1998 - Yanbaru whiskered bat
 Myotis zenatius  Ibáñez, Juste, Salicini, Puechmaille & Ruedi, 2019 - Zenati myotis 
Subgenus Pizonyx:
 Myotis albescens (E. Geoffroy, 1806) - silver-tipped myotis
 Myotis armiensis Carrión-Bonilla & Cook, 2020 - Armién's myotis
 Myotis atacamensis (Lataste, 1892) - Atacama myotis
 Myotis attenboroughi Moratelli et al., 2017 - Sir David Attenborough's myotis
 Myotis auriculus (Baker and  Stains, 1955) - southwestern myotis
 Myotis austroriparius (Rhoads, 1897) - southeastern myotis
 Myotis bakeri Moratelli, Novaes, Bonilla, & D. E. Wilson, 2019 - Baker's myotis
 Myotis brandtii (Eversmann, 1845) - Brandt's bat
 Myotis californicus (Audubon and  Bachman, 1842) - California myotis
 Myotis caucensis Allen, 1914 - Colombian black myotis
 Myotis chiloensis (Waterhouse, 1840) - Chilean myotis
 Myotis ciliolabrum (Merriam, 1886) - western small-footed bat, western small-footed myotis
 Myotis clydejonesi Moratelli, D. E. Wilson, A. L. Gardner, Fisher, & Gutierrez, 2016 - Clyde Jones's myotis
 Myotis cobanensis (Goodwin, 1955) - Guatemalan myotis 
 Myotis diminutus Moratelli & Wilson, 2011 - diminutive myotis
 Myotis dinellii Thomas, 1902 - Dinelli's myotis
 Myotis dominicensis Miller, 1902 - Dominican myotis
 Myotis elegans Hall, 1962 - elegant myotis
 Myotis evotis (H. Allen, 1864) - long-eared myotis
 Myotis findleyi Bogan, 1978 - Findley's myotis
 Myotis fortidens Miller and  Allen, 1928 - cinnamon myotis
 Myotis grisescens A.H. Howell, 1909 - gray bat 
 Myotis handleyi Moratelli, A. L. Gardner, J. A. Oliveira, & D. E. Wilson, 2013 - Handley's myotis
 Myotis izecksohni Moratelli, Peracchi, Dias & de Oliveira, 2011 - Izecksohn's myotis
 Myotis keaysi J.A. Allen, 1914 - hairy-legged myotis 
 Myotis keenii (Merriam, 1895) -  Keen's myotis
 Myotis larensis LaVal, 1973 - Lara myotis
 Myotis lavali Moratelli, Peracchi, Dias, & Oliveira, 2011 - LaVal's Myotis
 Myotis leibii (Audubon and  Bachman, 1842) - eastern small-footed bat
 Myotis levis (I. Geoffroy, 1824) - yellowish myotis
 Myotis lucifugus (Le Conte, 1831) - little brown bat, little brown myotis
 Myotis martiniquensis LaVal, 1973 - Schwartz's myotis
 Myotis midastactus Moratelli & Wilson, 2014 - golden myotis 
 Myotis nesopolus Miller, 1900 - Curacao myotis 
 Myotis nigricans (Schinz, 1821) - black myotis
 Myotis nyctor LaVal & Schwartz, 1974 - Barbados myotis
 Myotis occultus Hollister, 1909 - Arizona myotis
 Myotis oxyotus (Peters, 1867) - montane myotis
 Myotis peninsularis Miller, 1898 - peninsular myotis
 Myotis pilosatibialis LaVal, 1973 - northern hairy-legged myotis
 Myotis planiceps Baker, 1955 - flat-headed myotis
 Myotis riparius Handley, 1960 - riparian myotis
 Myotis ruber (E. Geoffroy, 1806) - red myotis 
 Myotis septentrionalis (Trouessart, 1897) - northern long-eared bat, northern myotis
 Myotis sibiricus (Kastschenko, 1905) - Siberian bat or Siberian whiskered myotis
 Myotis simus Thomas, 1901 - velvety myotis 
 Myotis sodalis Miller and  Allen, 1928 - Indiana bat
 Myotis thysanodes Miller, 1897 - fringed myotis
 Myotis velifer (J.A. Allen, 1890) - cave myotis
 Myotis vivesi Menegaux, 1901 - fish-eating bat, fish-eating myotis
 Myotis volans (H. Allen, 1866) - long-legged myotis
 Myotis yumanensis (H. Allen, 1864) - Yuma myotis
 Unclassified & dubious species:
 Myotis australis (Dobson, 1878) - Australian myotis (disputed species)
 Myotis oreias (Temminck, 1840) - Singapore whiskered bat

See also
 Bat adenovirus TJM

Notes

References

Literature cited
 Borisenko, A.V., Kruskop, S.V. and Ivanova, N.V. 2008. A new mouse-eared bat (Mammalia: Chiroptera: Vespertilionidae) from Vietnam. Russian Journal of Theriology 7(2):57–69.
 Han, N., Zhang, J., Reardon, T., Lin, L., Zhang, J. and Zhang, S. 2010. Revalidation of Myotis taiwanensis Ärnbäck-Christie-Linde 1908 and its molecular relationship with M. adversus (Horsfield 1824) (Vespertilionidae, Chiroptera) (subscription required). Acta Chiropterologica 12(2):449–456.*Happold, M. 2005. A new species of Myotis (Chiroptera: Vespertilionidae) from central Africa. Acta Chiropterologica 7(1):9–21.
 Ibáñez, C., García-Mudarra, J.L., Ruedi, M., Stadelmann, B. and Juste, J. 2006. The Iberian contribution to cryptic diversity in European bats. Acta Chiropterologica 8(2):277–297.
 Jiang, T., Sun, K., Chou, C., Zhang, Z. and Feng, J. 2010. First record of Myotis flavus (Chiroptera: Vespertilionidae) from mainland China and a reassessment of its taxonomic status. Zootaxa 2414:41–51.
 Lack, J.B., Roehrs, Z.P., Stanley, C.E., Ruedi, M. and Van Den Bussche, R.A. 2010. Molecular phylogenetics of Myotis indicate familial-level divergence for the genus Cistugo (Chiroptera) (subscription required). Journal of Mammalogy 91(4):976–992.
 Matveev, V.A., Kruskop, S.V. and Kramerov, D.A. 2005. Revalidation of Myotis petax Hollister, 1912 and its new status in connection with M. daubentonii (Kuhl, 1817) (Vespertilionidae, Chiroptera). Acta Chiropterologica 7(1):23–37.
 Mayer, F., Dietz, C. and Kiefer, A. 2007. Molecular species identification boosts bat diversity. Frontiers in Zoology 4(1):239–255.
 
 Roehrs, Z.P., Lack, J.B. and Van Den Bussche, R.A. 2010. Tribal phylogenetic relationships within Vespertilioninae (Chiroptera: Vespertilionidae) based on mitochondrial and nuclear sequence data (subscription required). Journal of Mammalogy 91(5):1073–1092.
 Simmons, N.B. 2005. Order Chiroptera. Pp. 312–529 in Wilson, D.E. and Reeder, D.M. (eds.). Mammal Species of the World: A Taxonomic and Geographic Reference. 3rd ed. Baltimore: The Johns Hopkins University Press, 2 vols., 2142 pp. 
 Stadelmann, B., Lin, L.-K., Kunz, T.H. and Ruedi, M. 2007. Molecular phylogeny of New World Myotis (Chiroptera, Vespertilionidae) inferred from mitochondrial and nuclear DNA genes (subscription required). Molecular Phylogenetics and Evolution 43(1):32–48.
 Tsytsulina, K. 2004. On the taxonomical status of Myotis abei Yoshikura, 1944 (Chiroptera, Vespertilionidae). Zoological Science 21:963–966.
Simmons, Nancy B.; Flanders, J.; Bakwo Fils, E. M.; Parker, Guy; Suter, Jamison D.; Bamba, Seinan; Keita, Mamady Kobele; Morales, Ariadna E.; Frick, Winifred F. 2021. A new dichromatic species of Myotis (Chiroptera: Vespertilionidae) from the Nimba Mountains, Guinea (American Museum novitates, no. 3963) American Museum Novitates. ISSN 0003-0082.

External links

 Myotis at Animal Diversity Web

Mouse-eared bats
Bat genera